Avert is an international charity that uses digital communications to increase health literacy on HIV and sexual health, among those most affected in areas of greatest need, in order to reduce new infections and improve health and well-being.

It works in partnership with organisations in countries most affected by HIV to develop and promote digital HIV and sexual health content and resources that are accurate, accessible, useful, and actionable. It focuses on digital communications to reach people online in spaces they are already spending time.

Avert’s work supports global efforts to end AIDS and achieve the Sustainable Development Goal for Health.

Avert is based in Brighton, UK, with staff members also based in South Africa.

Current strategy
Avert’s strategy has three objectives focused on increasing knowledge, confidence, skills and evidence-based practices among specific targeted audiences, in order to drive improvements in health literacy, self-efficacy, uptake of services, and quality of community and local health worker responses.

1.    Increase the HIV and sexual health-related knowledge, skills and confidence of those most at risk of HIV and poor sexual health, and those living with HIV.

2.    Expand and deepen the knowledge, skills and confidence of educators and advocates working on local responses to HIV and sexual health.

3.    Support evidence-based practice among primary HIV and sexual health practitioners.

Current projects

Avert.org
For over 27 years, the Avert.org website provided clear and trusted information about HIV and AIDS. The site changed many times as technology developed. In 2015, the Avert.org website had a major redesign, with a focus on mobile users.

The website was divided into two main areas – public and professional. The public section of the site provided information for individual on sexual health, HIV and STIs, and relationships – including personal stories from the site's users. It offered reassurance to people newly diagnosed with HIV and dispelled dangerous myths about HIV and AIDS. The professional section of the site provided a thoroughly researched and referenced resource on the global epidemic, alongside an up-to-date news service to inform people working in HIV programming, policy or research, health workers, teachers and students.

In line with the changing needs of the HIV epidemic, the Avert.org website was decommissioned in March 2022 with the learning and evidence it generated used to develop a new youth-focused sexual health brand, Be in the KNOW. During its lifetime, Avert.org reached over 215 million people.

Endorsements and accreditations 
Avert endorses the Principles for Digital Development and is a Gold standard endorser. Avert is also a signatory of the UK Patient Information Forum’s Health and Digital Literacy Charter. It also endorses the Pleasure Project’s ‘Pleasure Principles’, committing to a sex-positive approach to sexual health and rights.

In 2021, Avert was accredited by the Patient Information Forum (PIF). Avert has the ‘PIF TICK’ quality mark, ensuring the health information it produces is of the highest quality, clear and accurate.

In January 2015, Avert became a certified member of the Information Standard, a UK National Health Service (NHS) accreditation that recognises trustworthy health information.

Awards 
In 2012, Avert.org won the Nominet Internet Award under the 'Online Training and Education' category, in association with the British Library.

In 2005 the Avert.org website won the British Medical Association's Patient Information Award for Websites.

History and early work
Avert was founded in 1986, by Peter Kanabus and his wife Annabel, daughter of former Sainsbury's chairman Robert Sainsbury. In its first fifteen years the charity focused on producing educational publications and funding HIV-related educational, social and medical research.

A number of Avert's publications, such as the AIDS: Working With Young People (1993) teaching pack were based on substantial educational research. In addition many thousands of AVERT's booklets were distributed in the UK each year, covering such topics as sex education, sexuality and HIV.

Medical research funded by Avert included the first ever study of the effect of pregnancy on the progression of HIV disease, and social research included studies of HIV and drug use in UK prisons.

The Avert.org website was launched in 1995 in order to provide education about prevention of HIV and support for individuals living with HIV and AIDS. In 2022 the website was replaced by Beintheknow.org offering a more tailored resource, primarily for individuals in East and Southern Africa, and for the community health workers and primary practitioners that support them.

In 2001 the charity decided to concentrate on two key areas of work: its information and education website Avert.org website, and its programme work outside of the UK in countries with a particularly high or rapidly increasing rate of HIV infection.

The charity's work made headlines in 2008 when South African doctor Colin Pfaff was suspended from his post for supplying HIV positive, pregnant women with the antiretroviral drug AZT, which had been paid for by Avert. At the time the South African government had not approved the use of AZT to prevent mother-to-child transmission of HIV, even though it was recommended by the World Health Organization and was widely used in other developing countries. Rural doctors, scientists, AIDS activists and organisations rallied in support of Pfaff, and the charges were subsequently dropped.

In 2014, outputs of research funded by Avert (the Care in the Home Study) exploring challenges facing caregivers in rural South Africa was published in the PLOS ONE journal.

Until 2020, Avert funded a range of projects in developing countries. Avert worked with a variety of organisations, including Sangram in southwest India, Tholulwazi Uzivikele in KwaZulu Natal. The Umunthu Foundation in Malawi, Sisonke in South Africa, Phelisanang Bophelong in Lesotho, and Bwafwano Integrated Services Organisation (BISO) in Zambia.

References

External links
 Avert website
 Be in the KNOW website
 Boost website
 Youth Voices comic creator
 Avert’s HIV timeline

HIV/AIDS organisations in the United Kingdom
Organizations established in 1986
Health charities in the United Kingdom
British medical websites
Organisations based in Brighton and Hove
Organisations based in East Sussex
1986 establishments in England
Foreign charities operating in South Africa
Foreign charities operating in Malawi
Foreign charities operating in Lesotho
Foreign charities operating in Zambia